Ulysses and the Sirens is a 1909 oil painting by Herbert James Draper measuring . It is held at the Ferens Art Gallery in Kingston upon Hull, England. The gallery purchased the painting from Draper in 1910 for £600. Draper also painted a reduced replica that is housed at the Leeds Art Gallery. The subject of the painting is an episode in the epic poem Odyssey by Homer in which Ulysses is tormented by the voices of Sirens, although there are only two Sirens in Homer's poem and they stay in a meadow. The painting depicts Ulysses tied to the mast and forcibly attendant to the Sirens' seductions. Although the Sirens were depicted in ancient Greek art as scary, ugly creatures, Draper maintains the spirit but not the content of the story by transferring the Sirens' seductiveness from their song to a visible form, depicting the Sirens as beautiful mermaids who invade Ulysses' ship. The Sirens are nude or nearly so and their tails disappear as they board the ship. Draper's conflation of Sirens with mermaids and his sexualization of these figures are consistent with other artwork of the Victorian and Edwardian eras. Norwegian social theorist Jon Elster used the name of Draper's painting as the title for his 1979 book about rationality and precommitment.

References

Bibliography

1909 paintings
Maritime paintings
Nude art
Odysseus
Paintings depicting Greek myths
Paintings by Herbert James Draper
Paintings in Yorkshire and the Humber
Paintings of people
Sirens (mythology)
Paintings based on the Odyssey